Hirotaro Yamazaki ( Yamazaki Hirotaro) (3 September 1941 – 11 March 2021) was a Japanese politician.

References

1941 births
2021 deaths
20th-century Japanese politicians
21st-century Japanese politicians
Liberal Democratic Party (Japan) politicians
Japan New Party politicians
New Frontier Party (Japan) politicians
Mayors of places in Japan
Members of the House of Representatives (Japan)
People from North Jeolla Province